The black-thighed falconet (Microhierax fringillarius) is one of the smallest birds of prey, typically measuring between  long, with a  wingspan, which is a size comparable to a typical sparrow. It is native to Brunei Darussalam, Myanmar, Thailand, Malaysia, Singapore and Indonesia, and vagrant to Sri Lanka.

Taxonomy and systematics

Thomas Horsfield described to the Linnean Society of London in 1820 a Javan variety of Falco cærulescens (the collared falconet). He noted that "the Javan specimens are somewhat smaller, and differently marked" than the Bengal specimen which had been described by John Edwards in 1750.  A fuller description was published in his 1824 book, Zoological Researches in Java.

Also in 1824, Drapiez published the name Falco fringillarius, and Vigors proposed the genus Ierax or Hierax.

Description
This is a minute, shrike-like falcon, with a squarish tail that is frequently spread.  The adult male is glossy black above, with a white forehead streak that arcs around black cheeks.  It has a white or rufous-washed throat, with a white breast shading into a rufous abdomen.  Its thighs and flanks are black, as is its cere and legs.  In flight the male has white wings underneath with black barring on the primaries and secondary flight feathers, and light streaking on the underwing coverts.  There are three white bars underneath on the otherwise plain black tail.
The adult female is similar to the adult male, except the tail is longer.  The juvenile is similar to the adults, except that the white areas of the head are rufous.
The voice is a hard, high-pitched cry  and a fast repeated .

Habitat
The typical habitat is forest, forest edge and wooded open area. It can also frequently be found around human cultivation, villages, and near active slash-and-burn forest clearance; often by rivers, streams, and paddy fields.  It mostly lives below 1,500m elevation.

Food
This falconet mainly feeds on insects, including moths, butterflies, dragonflies, alate termites and cicadas, occasional small birds, and lizards.  Feeding behavior appears to often be social, with feeding parties up to ten recorded.  Much of the prey is taken during quick flights from a perch.

Sociosexual behaviour and breeding
This falconet is generally social and gregarious, often found in loose pairs or groups of ten or more.  The breeding season for this falcon varies by location, with populations up to the North of the equator breeding mostly in February–June.  To the South of the equator, egg-laying is recorded in Java in November–December.
This falconet usually uses old nest holes of barbets, or occasionally old woodpecker holes.  No material is added in the cavity aside from insect remains.  The typical clutch size is between 2-5 eggs.  Incubation and fledging periods are unknown.  The nest hole may be used as a roost by adults year-round.

Population
There is no data on population densities, but like many tiny falconets, the total numbers are probably under-recorded.  The overall range extends more than 1.5 million km².  Population assessments vary from common (in Sumatra and Borneo), to fairly common (in Thailand), to scarce (in Java and Bali).
In any case, the population seems to be in the upper tens of thousands, and appears to be tolerant of habitat disturbance.

References

External links

Historical illustrations
Although most of these illustrations were published with the name Falco cærulescens Linn., Sharpe determined that they represent M. fringillarius (Drapiez).  (Catalogue Birds British Museum 1874, v. 1, p. 367)

 Horsfield (1824), Zoological Researches in Java, plate 35. Commons, BHL
 Temminck (1824), Planches Coloriées, plate 97 
 Vieillot & Oudart (1825), Galerie des Oiseaux, plate 18. BHL (Uni. Illinois), BHL (Smithsonian) 
 Kittlitz (1832), Kupfertafeln zur Naturgeschichte der Vögel, plate 3, fig. 2.  IA, BHL, Commons
 Schlegel (1866), De vogels van Nederlandsch Indië, book 3 Valkvogels, plate 2, fig. 1. Google books, Wikimedia Commons, BHL

black-thighed falconet
Birds of Southeast Asia
black-thighed falconet